Baandi is a Pakistani social drama television series produced by Asif Raza Mir and Babar Javed under banner A&B Entertainment and originally broadcast on ARY Digital from 9 September 2012 to 3 February 2013 with a total of 20 episodes. It stars Aijaz Aslam, Maria Wasti, Nimra Bucha and Yasra Rizvi in leading roles.

Plot summary 

As the word Baandi means slave girl, a woman who is not free or bound to someone. Thus, the series focuses that woman in our society are always bound to their duties or responsibilities and centers on the lives of three different women, hail from different backgrounds.

Cast 

 Nimra Bucha as Maya
 Maria Wasti as Razia
 Yasra Rizvi as Misbah
 Aijaz Aslam as Malik Shehryar (Maya's husband)
 Ali Afzal as Rizwan (Misbah's husband)
 Imran Ashraf as Kamyar (Maya and Shehryar's son)
 Muneeb Butt as Armaan (Misbah and Rizwan's son)
 Pari Hashmi as Kiran (Misbah and Rizwan's daughter)
 Farah Nadeem as Ishrat (Rizwan's sister)
 Shahid Naqvi as Kamala (Razia's husband)
 Zaheen Tahira as Kamla's mother
 Asma Abbas as Misbah's mother
 Sajid Shah as Ghafoor (Kamala companion)
 Adnan Jaffar as Inspector Hassan
 Mubashira Khanam

References 

Pakistani drama television series
Urdu-language television shows
ARY Digital original programming
2012 Pakistani television series debuts
2013 Pakistani television series endings
A&B Entertainment